Langkawi Ring Road, Federal Route, is a major highway around Langkawi Island, Kedah, Malaysia. The 46 km (28.6 mi) road consists of Jalan Air Hangat, Jalan Padang Matsirat and Jalan Ulu Melaka.

Federal Route 112 is the main circular trunk road that circles through Langkawi Island. Both its starting terminal (Kilometre Zero) and the ending terminal are located at Kuah town.

History
In 2007, the stretch of Jalan Padang Matsirat (Kuah – Padang Matsirat) was upgraded from two-lane single carriageway into four lane dual-carriageway.

Features
Most sections of Federal Route 122 were built under the JKR R5 road standard, allowing a maximum speed limit of up to 90 km/h.

List of junctions and town

Jalan Padang Matsirat sections (Kuah – Padang Matsirat)

Jalan Ulu Melaka sections (Padang Matsirat – Ayer Hangat)

Jalan Ayer Hangat sections (Ayer Hangat – Kuah)

References

Malaysian Federal Roads
Highways in Malaysia
Ring roads in Malaysia